The Red Globe is a variety of very large, seeded red grapes with firm flesh used mainly as a table grape. It can be grown outdoors in very warm areas with long growing seasons such as California, Chile or Australia, but in most of the world it is strictly a greenhouse grape.

While seedless table grapes have become the market standard in the United States, in Japan high quality fruit has a very strong demand. For this reason, the majority of Red Globe production in the US and Australia are exported to Asia. Red Globe grapes can be consumed fresh, dried for raisins, and also used for various grape juices. Because of their large size, they can be used as ice cubes in beverages when frozen.

References 

Table grape varieties